WVGS FM 91.9 ("91-9 The Buzz") is a Statesboro, Georgia college radio station that plays a diverse range of music, including rock, rap and hip-hop.  It is owned and operated by the students of Georgia Southern University, and is involved in public service in the community, including a book drive and a smoke-out for cancer in early 2010.

Their original assigned frequency was 107.7 FM. They were also previously known as "The Voice of Georgia Southern."

External links
WVGS - 91.9 The Buzz's official website
WVGS - 91.9 The Buzz on Myspace
WVGS alumni site

VGS
VGS
Radio stations established in 1975